John Moolachira is the current serving Archbishop of Guwahati.

Early life 
He was born in Puthussery Kadavu, Kerala on 14 December 1951.

Priesthood 
He was ordained a Catholic Priest for the Roman Catholic Diocese of Tezpur on 23 October 1978.

Episcopate 
He was appointed Bishop of Diphu on 14 February 2007 by Pope John Paul II and ordained a bishop on 15 April 2007. He was appointed Coadjutor Archbishop of Guwahati on 9 April 2011. He succeeded as Archbishop of Guwahati on 18 January 2012.

References

External links

Living people
20th-century Roman Catholic bishops in India
21st-century Roman Catholic archbishops in India
1951 births
Christian clergy from Kerala
People from Wayanad district
People from Kerala